Sir Arthur George Murchison Fletcher,  (27 September 1878 – 9 April 1954) was a British colonial administrator.

Career
He was Colonial Secretary of Ceylon from 1926 to 1929, during which time he was Acting Governor from 1927 to 1928. He was appointed Governor of Fiji and High Commissioner for the Western Pacific from 22 November 1929 to 28 November 1936, and Governor of Trinidad and Tobago from 1936 to 1938. His tenure coincided with the British West Indian labour unrest of 1934–39.

Murchison Fletcher is mentioned in several contemporary Trinidadian calypso songs, notably "The Governor's Resignation" and "Commission's Report" by Attila the Hun and "We Mourn the Loss of Sir Murchison Fletcher" by Lord Executor.

References 

|-

Governors of Fiji
Members of the Legislative Council of Fiji
Governors of British Ceylon
Governors of Trinidad and Tobago
High Commissioners for the Western Pacific
Knights Commander of the Order of St Michael and St George
Commanders of the Order of the British Empire
1878 births
1954 deaths
Chief Secretaries of Ceylon
Members of the Legislative Council of Ceylon